Pezizomycetes are a class of fungi within the division Ascomycota.

Pezizomycetes are apothecial fungi, meaning that their spore-producing/releasing bodies (ascoma) are typically disk-like, bearing on their upper surfaces a layer of cylindrical spore-producing cells called asci, from which the spores are forcibly discharged.

Important groups include: cup fungi (Peziza), morels, Elfin saddles, and truffles.

References

Pezizomycotina
Fungus classes
Taxa described in 1997

de:Pezizomycetes
ru:Pezizomycetes